The Women's downhill competition at the 2013 World Championships was held on Sunday, February 10. 41 athletes from 20 nations competed.

Results
The race was started at 11:00 local time (UTC+1).

References

External links
  
 FIS-Ski.com - AWSC 2013 - calendar & results

Women's Downhill
2013 in Austrian women's sport
FIS